Hypocenomyce tinderryensis is a species of crustose lichen in the family Ophioparmaceae. It was described as a new species in 2007 by Australian lichenologist John Alan Elix. The type was collected in Tinderry Range in New South Wales, for which it is named. It somewhat resembles the type species of Hypocenomyce, H. scalaris, but it can be distinguished from that lichen by its smaller apothecia, longer ascospores, and differences in the morphology of the squamules (scales) that comprise the thallus.

References

Umbilicariales
Lichen species
Lichens described in 2007
Taxa named by John Alan Elix
Lichens of Australia